is a former Japanese football player. He played for Japan national team. His son Daiya Maekawa is also footballer.

Club career
Maekawa was educated at and played for Hirado High School. After graduating in 1986, he joined Japan Soccer League side Mazda. When Japan's first-ever professional league J1 League started in 1993, Mazda was transformed to Sanfrecce Hiroshima for whom he continued to play. In April 1990, he had a trial at Manchester United. He had been the first-choice GK for the club since 1989 although he was prone to injuries. He decided to have an operation on his shoulder in 1998 and his place was filled in by Takashi Shimoda who kept the place after Maekawa came back. Maekawa was transferred to J2 League side Oita Trinita in 2000 before retiring from the game after the 2001 season.

National team career
Maekawa was capped 17 times for the Japanese national team from 1992 to 1996. His first cap came on June 7, 1992 in a friendly against Wales in Ehime Matsuyama Athletic Stadium. He was a member of the Japan team that won the 1992 Asian Cup. He played 2 games after first-choice keeper Shigetatsu Matsunaga was shown a red card in the semi-final against China.

Coaching career
After finishing his playing career, he remained at Oita Trinita and worked in the areas of marketing, operations and developments until 2005. He is now a coach at Sanfrecce Tsuneishi Soccer School, one of the affiliated soccer schools of Sanfrecce Hiroshima.

Club statistics

National team statistics

Honors

International
Japan
AFC Asian Cup (1): 1992 1992 Asian Cup (champions)

References

External links

Japan National Football Team Database

1968 births
Living people
Association football people from Nagasaki Prefecture
Japanese footballers
Japan international footballers
Japan Soccer League players
J1 League players
J2 League players
Sanfrecce Hiroshima players
Oita Trinita players
1992 AFC Asian Cup players
AFC Asian Cup-winning players
Association football goalkeepers